Luther Preparatory School (LPS or Luther Prep) is a residential four-year secondary school located in Watertown, Wisconsin, United States. Established in 1865, it is owned and operated by the Wisconsin Evangelical Lutheran Synod (WELS). LPS focuses on preparing students to become WELS pastors and teachers and to continue their education at Martin Luther College (MLC), a WELS college in New Ulm, Minnesota. Curriculum at LPS focuses on the liberal arts and religious studies.

LPS has an enrollment of approximately 415 students, with slightly more boys than girls; three-fourths of the student body lives in dormitories on the  campus. The campus has a main classroom building, dormitories, a student union/gymnasium, an auditorium, and a cafeteria. There are several sports fields, including a track, tennis courts, a football field, a soccer field, and softball and baseball fields. There are 30 full-time faculty members and nine additional piano instructors. Nine tutors live with students in the dormitories.

History
Luther Preparatory School is the oldest Lutheran high school in the United States. LPS began its history as the prep department of Northwestern College, a pre-ministerial college established in 1865. The prep department received its own identity in 1974 as Northwestern Preparatory School (NPS). In 1995, Northwestern College moved to New Ulm, Minnesota, and combined with Dr. Martin Luther College to form Martin Luther College. In the same year, Martin Luther Preparatory School (MLPS) of Prairie du Chien, Wisconsin, was closed and combined with NPS to form Luther Preparatory School.

Purpose 
The mission of Luther Preparatory School is to prepare and encourage young men and women for the full-time ministry in the Wisconsin Evangelical Lutheran Synod.

Athletics 
Prep's mascot is the Phoenix. LPS plays in the Capitol Conference of WIAA. Fall sports include football and soccer for boys, volleyball and tennis for girls, and cross country for both. In the winter, there are boys' and girls' basketball, as well as boys' wrestling. Spring sports are baseball, softball, track and field, boys' tennis, girls' soccer, and golf. Luther Prep also offers intramural sports, such as basketball and volleyball.

References

 Braun, John A (2000). Together in Christ: A History of the Wisconsin Evangelical Lutheran Synod. Milwaukee: Northwestern Publishing House.

External links
 Luther Preparatory School
NPS-LPS Brief History
Watertown History: Northwestern
Wisconsin Evangelical Lutheran Synod Web Site

Private high schools in Wisconsin
Lutheran schools in Wisconsin
Boarding schools in Wisconsin
Educational institutions established in 1865
Schools in Jefferson County, Wisconsin
Secondary schools affiliated with the Wisconsin Evangelical Lutheran Synod
1865 establishments in Wisconsin